Agnieszka Włodarczyk (born 13 December 1980) is a Polish actress and singer. As an actress she is best known for her roles in the movie Sara and a TV comedy series 13 posterunek. In 2007, she released her debut album, Nie dla oka....

Early life 
Włodarczyk was born on 13 December 1980 in Sławno. Her parents divorced when she was two years old. After her mother, Anna Stasiukiewicz, remarried, the family moved from town to town, including Ciechanów, Poznań and Warsaw. She attended many primary schools.

Career 
In March 1996, Włodarczyk appeared in Janusz Józefowicz's play Tyle miłości at Studio Buffo theatre in Warsaw. She subsequently took part in the musical Metro, another play directed by Józefowicz, and the music video for the song "Reklama" by Polish singer K.A.S.A.. Her first big success came in 1997 when she appeared in Maciej Ślesicki's movie Sara alongside such stars of Polish cinema as Marek Perepeczko, Bogusław Linda and Cezary Pazura.

Włodarczyk played the role of Agnieszka Cezary in a Polish comedy sitcom 13 posterunek. The first series ran from 1997 to 1998 and turned out to be a massive hit in Poland. In 1999, she starred in a TV series entitled Pierwszy milion and one year after, in its film version. In 2000, she also took part in the second series of 13 posterunek and did several guest appearances in the soap opera Na dobre i na złe and the comedy series Świat według Kiepskich. In 2001 and 2003, she starred in the series Zostać miss. Also in 2001, she accepted the part of Wiktoria Potoczny in a Polish soap opera Plebania. She followed that by acting in a number of top-grossing Polish movies, such as E=mc² (2002) or Nigdy w życiu! (2004).

In 2005, Włodarczyk was one of the contestants of Taniec z gwiazdami, the first season of the Polish edition of Dancing with the Stars, where she took the seventh place. From March to June 2007, she participated in a Polsat TV show Jak oni śpiewają, which was the Polish version of Soapstar Superstar. She won the show, garnering over 60% of all votes, and on 30 November 2007, her debut album was released, entitled Nie dla oka.... Although the first single "Zawsze byłam" became a hit in Poland, the album received unfavourable reviews. In the same year, Włodarczyk hosted the Miss Polonia 2007 competition. In 2008, she recorded a brand new dance song "To on" which was released on a compilation by Radio Eska. She also took part in the third season of the TV show Gwiazdy tańczą na lodzie, the Polish version of Dancing on Ice.

Between 2009 and 2012, Włodarczyk appeared in the TV series Pierwsza miłość. 2011 saw the release of her second, Christmas album Najpiękniejsze polskie kolędy, and in 2012, she took part in the film Kac Wawa. In spring 2014, she took part in the Polish version of Your Face Sounds Familiar, called Twoja twarz brzmi znajomo, where she came second.

Filmography

Movies
 1997:  Sara
 1999: Pierwszy million
 2001: Poranek kojota
 2002: Rób swoje, ryzyko jest twoje 
 2002: E=mc²
 2004: Nigdy w życiu!
 2006: Job, czyli ostatnia szara komórka
 2012: Kac Wawa

TV series
 1997-98: 13 posterunek
 1999: Pierwszy million
 2000: 13 posterunek 2
 2001: Zostać miss
 2001-12: Plebania
 2003: Zostać miss 2
 2004: Dziki
 2004: Talki z resztą
 2005: Czego się boją faceci, czyli seks w mniejszym mieście
 2005: Dziki 2. Pojedynek
 2006-10: My baby
 2007: Ja wam pokażę!
 2009-12: Pierwsza miłość

Discography

References

External links
 Agnieszka Włodarczyk's official page at Facebook

1980 births
Living people
People from Sławno
Polish film actresses
Polish stage actresses
Polish pop singers
21st-century Polish singers
21st-century Polish women singers
Polish television actresses